Jingle Jangle is the third studio album released by The Archies, a fictional bubblegum pop band from the Archie comics universe. It was produced by Jeff Barry.  It is their first album released on the Kirshner Record label.  The album  features the hit single "Jingle Jangle". That song peaked at number 10 on the Billboard Hot 100.  The album peaked at number 125 on the Billboard Top LPs chart.

Track listing

Charts

References

1969 albums
The Archies albums
Albums produced by Jeff Barry